Laurence Dale Lovick (born March 4, 1944) is an educator and former political figure in British Columbia, Canada. He represented Nanaimo from 1986 to 2001 in the Legislative Assembly of British Columbia as a member of the NDP.

He was born in Vancouver, British Columbia, and was educated at the University of British Columbia and Carleton University. Lovick was an instructor at Malaspina College in Nanaimo, where he was also head of the English department. At the time of his first election, Nanaimo was a dual-member district, and Lovick served alongside Dave Stupich; Stupich resigned in 1988 and was succeeded in a by-election by Jan Pullinger, whom Lovick would later marry. When the province's electoral districts were realigned into single member districts for the 1991 election, Lovick continued to represent Nanaimo, while Pullinger moved to the new neighbouring district of Cowichan-Ladysmith.

Lovick was Speaker of the Legislative Assembly of British Columbia from 1996 to 1998. He served in the provincial cabinet as Minister of Labour and Minister of Aboriginal Affairs from 1998 to 1999, as Minister of Aboriginal Affairs from 1999 to 2000. He was also government whip from 2000 to 2001.

Lovick was the editor of Tommy Douglas Speaks, published in 1979, and was a contributor to The Canadian Encyclopedia.

In 2004, he was named to the board of directors for the Nanaimo Area Land Trust.

References 

1944 births
British Columbia New Democratic Party MLAs
Living people
Members of the Executive Council of British Columbia
Politicians from Vancouver
Speakers of the Legislative Assembly of British Columbia